Brendan Evans was the defending champion, but he failed to qualify for the event.
Ričardas Berankis won in the final 6–4, 6–4, against Go Soeda.

Seeds

Draw

Finals

Top half

Bottom half

References
 Main Draw
 Qualifying Draw

Aegon Trophy - Singles
2010 Singles